

Ceollach (or Cellach) was a medieval Bishop of Mercia. His consecration dates and death dates are unknown. He was Irish by birth and was trained in Ireland. Before his death, he left or resigned his see and went to the monastery of Iona.

Citations

References

External links
 

Anglo-Saxon bishops of Lichfield
7th-century English bishops
7th-century Irish bishops
Mercian people
Irish expatriates in England